Nakaa Beach is located at the northern tip of Makin Atoll in Kiribati's Gilbert Islands. It is an important site in the traditional mythology of the island group, being the departing point for the spirits of the dead heading to the underworld.

Nakaa is the legendary guardian of the gateway to the place of the dead.

References

Landforms of Kiribati
Water in Kiribati
Beaches of Oceania